The Warren Hills Regional School District is comprehensive public school district located in Warren County, New Jersey, United States,  that serves seventh grade through twelfth grades. The district includes students from the municipalities of Franklin Township, Mansfield Township, Washington Borough and Washington Township, while students from Oxford Township attend the district's high school for grades 9-12 as part of a sending/receiving relationship.

As of the 2020–21 school year, the district, comprised of two schools, had an enrollment of 1,745 students and 156.8 classroom teachers (on an FTE basis), for a student–teacher ratio of 11.1:1.

The district is classified by the New Jersey Department of Education as being in District Factor Group "FG", the fourth-highest of eight groupings. District Factor Groups organize districts statewide to allow comparison by common socioeconomic characteristics of the local districts. From lowest socioeconomic status to highest, the categories are A, B, CD, DE, FG, GH, I and J.

Both Warren Hills Regional Middle School and Warren Hills Regional High School are accredited through the Middle States Association of Colleges and Schools through the Excellence by Design protocols.

History
The Warren Hills Regional School District first operated its schools in the 1967-1968 school year. The current Warren Hills Regional High School opened its doors in September 1967 as Warren Hills Regional Senior High School, and relieved overcrowding conditions at Washington High School (now Warren Hills Regional Middle School) while simultaneously providing upgraded and modern facilities for the district's high school students in Grades 10-12. The former Washington High School became Warren Hills Regional Junior High School and served the district's students in Grades 7-9. In 1989 an addition at Warren Hills Regional Senior High School was completed, allowing the 9th grade to move from the junior high school to the high school.  With that the high school was given its present name of Warren Hills Regional High School, and the junior high school was given its current name of Warren Hills Regional Middle School.

Schools 
Schools in the district (with 2020–21 enrollment data from the National Center for Education Statistics) are:
Warren Hills Regional Middle School with 542 students in grades 7 and 8 (located in Washington Borough)
Nicholas Remondelli, Principal
Robert Cacchio, Assistant Principal
Warren Hills Regional High School with 1,179 students in grades 9 - 12 (located in Washington Township)
Chris Kavcak, Principal
Glenn Barker, Assistant Principal
Susan Rader, Assistant Principal

Administration
The district-wide administration consists of:
Earl C. Clymer III, Superintendent
Donnamarie Palmiere, Business Administrator / Board Secretary

Board of education
The district's board of education, comprised of nine members, sets policy and oversees the fiscal and educational operation of the district through its administration. As a Type II school district, the board's trustees are elected directly by voters to serve three-year terms of office on a staggered basis, with three seats up for election each year held (since 2012) as part of the November general election. The board appoints a superintendent to oversee the district's day-to-day operations and a business administrator to supervise the business functions of the district. Seats on the board are allocated to the constituent municipalities based on population, with three seats each allocated to Mansfield Township and Washington Township, two to Washington Borough and one seat assigned to Franklin Township. Oxford Township does not have representation on the board since it sends its students as part of a sending/receiving relationship.

References

External links
Warren Hills Regional School District website
NJ School Performance Report: Warren Hills Regional High School, 2012-13
NJ School Performance Report: Warren Hills Regional Middle School, 2012-13
NJ.com High School Sports for Warren Hills Regional High School

1967 establishments in New Jersey
School districts established in 1967
Franklin Township, Warren County, New Jersey
Mansfield Township, Warren County, New Jersey
Oxford Township, New Jersey
Washington, New Jersey
Washington Township, Warren County, New Jersey
New Jersey District Factor Group FG
School districts in Warren County, New Jersey